St. Louis Downtown Airport  is a public-use airport located in Greater St. Louis, one mile (2 km) east of the central business district of Cahokia Heights, in St. Clair County, Illinois, United States. It is owned by the Bi-State Development Agency.  The airport is located less than 3 miles from the Gateway Arch riverfront in St. Louis and is used by many business aircraft visiting the St. Louis region.  Airport services include one full-service 24-hour fixed-base operator, an instrument landing system, an FAA air traffic control tower, and its own dedicated Index B aircraft rescue and firefighting (ARFF) service. It is utilized mainly by Saint Louis University's Parks College of Engineering, Aviation and Technology for training purposes, as well as the St. Louis Cardinals for charter flights to away games.

The St. Louis metropolitan area is also served by St. Louis Lambert International Airport in St. Louis County, Missouri; MidAmerica St. Louis Airport in Belleville, Illinois; St. Louis Regional Airport in Bethalto, Illinois; and Spirit of St. Louis Airport in Chesterfield, Missouri.

Facilities and aircraft
(2,134 x 46 m), 12L/30R measuring 5,301 x 75 ft. (1,616 x 23 m), and 5/23 measuring 2,799 x 75 ft. (853 x 23 m).

For the 12-month period ending December 31, 2021, the airport had 103,000 aircraft operations per year, an average of 284 per day. This includes 88% general aviation, 11% air taxi, and <1% of both commercial and military. This was down from 170,000 annual operations in 2005. At that time there were 111 aircraft based at this airport: 77 single-engine and 14 multi-engine airplanes, 13 helicopters, 6 jets, and 1 glider. This was down from 170,000 annual operations and 281 based aircraft in 2005.

Historic Hangar #2 houses the Greater Saint Louis Air & Space Museum. The airport is still home to the nation's oldest flight school, Parks College of Engineering and Aviation's Center for Aerospace Sciences, which holds CAA Flight School Certificate #1.

History

The airport opened in 1929 as Curtiss-Steinberg Airport. In 1940 it was renamed Curtiss-Parks Airport, followed by Parks Metropolitan Airport later that same year.

Taken over by the United States Army Air Forces on 1 August 1939 as a basic (level 1) pilot training airfield. Assigned to USAAF Gulf Coast Training Center (later Central Flying Training Command). Parks Air College conducted contract basic flying training. Flying training was performed with Fairchild PT-19s as the primary trainer. Also had several PT-17 Stearmans and a few P-40 Warhawks assigned.  Inactivated 12 March 1944 with the drawdown of AAFTC's pilot training program.

The airport closed in 1959 and reopened six years later as Bi-State Parks Airport. It was renamed St. Louis Downtown-Parks Airport in 1984 and received its current name in 1999.

The two survivors of the airport's original four hangars, Hangar 1 and Hangar 2, are listed on the National Register of Historic Places.

Past airline service

In 1971, Air Mid-America Airlines was operating scheduled passenger flights from the airport nonstop to Chicago Midway Airport (MDW) and Springfield, IL (SPI) with 40-passenger Convair 600 turboprop airliners.

In 1984, Air Midwest was operating scheduled passenger flights from the airport nonstop to Chicago Midway Airport (MDW) and Kansas City Downtown Airport (MKC) with Swearingen Metro II commuter propjets.

Accidents and incidents
On January 22, 2018, a helicopter crashed during low flight on a training mission near the airport. Neither the student or instructor on board were injured.
On May 23, 2019, a helicopter crashed while operating at the airport. Neither the student nor the instructor on board were injured.

See also

 Illinois World War II Army Airfields
 31st Flying Training Wing (World War II)

References

 Manning, Thomas A. (2005), History of Air Education and Training Command, 1942–2002.  Office of History and Research, Headquarters, AETC, Randolph AFB, Texas 
 Shaw, Frederick J. (2004), Locating Air Force Base Sites, History’s Legacy, Air Force History and Museums Program, United States Air Force, Washington DC.

External links
 St. Louis Downtown Airport (official website)
 

USAAF Contract Flying School Airfields
Airfields of the United States Army Air Forces in Missouri
Metro Transit (St. Louis)
Airports in Illinois
Airports in Greater St. Louis
Airports established in 1929
Transportation buildings and structures in St. Clair County, Illinois
USAAF Central Flying Training Command
American Theater of World War II